Manasse Mampala (born 18 July 2000) is a Congolese professional footballer who plays as a forward for Hyde United. He turned professional at Everton in 2018 and spent the 2020–21 season with Queens Park Rangers, without making a first-team appearance for either club.

Early life
Manasse Mampala was born on 18 July 2000 in Kinshasa, Democratic Republic of the Congo, and moved to England at the age of two.

Manasse lived in Leeds, England for several years, attending Cockburn School.

Playing career

Early career
Mampala joined the Academy at Everton at the age of 15 and went on to score 11 goals and pick up six assists during 18 appearances for the under-18s during the 2017–18 Professional Development League season. He turned professional at Goodison Park in July 2018 and signed another one-year contract in summer 2019. He played four EFL Trophy games, however he was released in June 2020 after failing to establish himself in the under-23 team. He joined Queens Park Rangers in October 2019 and was placed in the club's Under-23 team.

Carlisle United
On 23 July 2021, Mampala signed a one-year contract with EFL League Two club Carlisle United following a spell on trial where he impressed manager Chris Beech by scoring two goals in pre-season friendlies. He made his debut in the English Football League on the opening day of the 2021–22 season, coming on as a 78th-minute substitute for Jon Mellish in a 0–0 draw with Colchester United at Brunton Park on 7 August 2021. He was released by the club at the end of the 2021–22 season.

Statistics

References

2000 births
Living people
Footballers from Kinshasa
Democratic Republic of the Congo footballers
Association football forwards
Democratic Republic of the Congo expatriate footballers
Expatriate footballers in England
Everton F.C. players
Queens Park Rangers F.C. players
Carlisle United F.C. players
Weymouth F.C. players
English Football League players
National League (English football) players
21st-century Democratic Republic of the Congo people